Choba is a settlement in Kenya's Eastern Province.

There is also a place named Choba mentioned in the apocryphal Book of Judith.

References 

Populated places in Eastern Province (Kenya)